Austral Líneas Aéreas Flight 205 was a regularly scheduled domestic Austral Líneas Aéreas flight operating a route between Buenos Aires and Mar del Plata in Argentina that crashed after encountering poor weather conditions during landing on 16 January 1959, killing 51 of the 52 passengers and crew on board. At the time, the crash was the second-worst accident in Argentine aviation history and is currently the sixth-worst involving a Curtiss C-46 Commando.

Accident
The Curtiss C-46 Commando, registration LV-GED, took off from Buenos Aires at 19:50 local time with five crew members and 47 passengers aboard for an approximately 250-mile flight to Mar del Plata. The aircraft had already been delayed for 35 minutes due to poor weather conditions at its destination. The flight was uneventful and Flight 205 was cleared for landing by controllers on runway 12 as it neared Mar Del Plata Airport. At the time the airport's non-directional beacon (NDB) was not functional, contributing to issues with navigation. Missing the approach, the captain decided to commence a go-around. All members of the crew were killed and the only survivor of the 47 passengers aboard the crash was seriously injured, still he managed to swim until the coast.

Causes
An investigation of the crash placed most of the blame for the accident on the crew. The pilot was not familiar with the airspace and had miscalculated his instrument approach, resulting in a missed approach. In addition, the crew's mental state contributed to the subsequent stall and loss of control that caused the aircraft to crash. Contributing factors were the non-functioning radio beacon and the poor visibility which made discerning the airport's lights and runway difficult.

See also
Austral Líneas Aéreas Flight 46
Austral Líneas Aéreas Flight 2553
Austral Líneas Aéreas Flight 901
1947 BSAA Avro Lancastrian Star Dust accident

References

Aviation accidents and incidents in 1959
Aviation accidents and incidents in Argentina
1959 in Argentina
Accidents and incidents involving the Curtiss-Wright C-46 Commando
January 1959 events in South America